Rick Lewis is an American politician and former law enforcement officer serving as a member of the Oregon House of Representatives. He represents the 18th district, which covers southern Clackamas and northeastern Marion counties.

Early life and education
Lewis grew up in Sheridan, Wyoming, and entered the military after graduating from high school upon the advice of his father. Lewis graduated from the University of Wyoming, and served in the Laramie and Gillette police forces.

Career 
He moved to Oregon in 1984, serving as a sergeant in the Umatilla police department, and became Union chief of police in 1986. Lewis later served as Bandon chief of police, and as chief of police of Silverton from 1998 until his retirement on August 2, 2012. He was elected mayor of Silverton in 2014, defeating incumbent Stu Rasmussen, and reelected in 2016.

On January 30, 2017, State Representative Vic Gilliam resigned due to deteriorating health. Lewis announced his candidacy for appointment to the vacant seat along with Jerome Rosa and Glenn Holum. On February 22, 2017, Lewis was selected as Gilliam's replacement by the Marion and Clackamas County commissioners. He resigned his position as Mayor and was sworn in on February 23.

References

External links
 Legislative website

Date of birth missing (living people)
Living people
21st-century American politicians
American municipal police chiefs
Mayors of places in Oregon
Republican Party members of the Oregon House of Representatives
Oregon police officers
People from Sheridan, Wyoming
People from Silverton, Oregon
University of Wyoming alumni
Wyoming police officers
People from Bandon, Oregon
People from Union County, Oregon
Year of birth missing (living people)